Independent Olympic Athletes are scheduled to compete in the 2017 Asian Winter Games in Sapporo and Obihiro, Japan from February 19 to 26. The team is scheduled to compete in one sport: ice hockey, and consists of 23 athletes.

Background
The Kuwait Olympic Committee was suspended in October 2015, due to political interference. Therefore, the country is scheduled to compete under the Olympic flag as Independent Olympic Athletes.

Competitors
The following table lists the delegation per sport and gender.

Ice hockey

The Independent Olympic Athletes are scheduled to compete in division 2 of the men's tournament. The Independent Olympic Athletes finished in sixth place (16th place overall) in division 2 of the competition.

Men's tournament

Independent Olympic Athletes were represented by the following 23 athletes:

Dhari Alomran (G)
Jasem Alsarraf (G)
Jasem Dashti (G)
Meshal Alajmi (D)
Jasem Alawadhi (D)
Meshal Alfoudari (D)
Fahad Alhenaidi (D)
Saleh Almaghrabi (D)
Mohammad Almaraqi (D)
Abdullah Alzidan (D)
Hussain Baqer (D)
Ahmad Alajmi (F)
Hamad Alajmi (F)
Mohammad Alajmi (F)
Salem Alajmi (F)
Abdullah Alasousi (F)
Yousef Alkandari (F)
Abdulaziz Almaraghy (F)
Abdullah Almaragi (F)
Hamad Alshayji (F)
Yousef Andekali (F)
Bashar Mohammed (F)
Abdulaziz Shetail (F)

Legend: G = Goali, D = Defense, F = Forward
Group A

References

Nations at the 2017 Asian Winter Games
Asian Winter Games
Kuwait at the Asian Winter Games